The resident commissioner of the Philippines was a non-voting member of the United States House of Representatives sent by the Philippines from 1907 until its internationally recognized independence in 1946. It was similar to current non-voting members of Congress such as the resident commissioner of Puerto Rico and delegates from Washington, D.C., Guam, the Northern Mariana Islands and other territories of the United States.

Like current non-voting members, resident commissioners could speak and otherwise participate in the business of the House, but did not have full voting rights. Two resident commissioners were sent until 1937, when after the establishment of the Commonwealth of the Philippines, the number was changed to one.

History

The Philippines was a United States territory from 13 August 1898 until Philippine independence was internationally recognized on 4 July 1946.

The office was first created by the Philippine Organic Act of 1902, section 8 and re-authorized on its subsequent replacements—the Jones Law of 1916 (known as the Philippine Autonomy Act) section 20, and the Tydings–McDuffie Act of 1934 (known as the Philippine Independence Act) section 7(5).

Election 
The procedures for appointment of the resident commissioners were ambiguous and a source of friction. Under the Philippine Organic Act of 1902, the two resident commissioners were to be elected by the Philippine Legislature, with each chamber (the entirely-appointed, American-majority Philippine Commission and the fully-elected and all-Filipino Philippine Assembly) voting separately. The resident commissioners were to be elected biennially from the time of the first meeting of the Philippine Legislature in 1907. Benito Legarda and Pablo Ocampo became the first two resident commissioners.

Upon the passage of the Jones Law in 1916, the resident commissioners were still selected in the same way, but by this time now had three-year terms. Jaime C. de Veyra and Teodoro R. Yangco were the first resident commissioners under the Jones Law.

The Tydings–McDuffie Act of 1934 reduced the number of resident commissioners to one, and ordered the enactment of a new constitution. Upon the passage of the 1935 Constitution, it tasked the National Assembly (the successor of the Philippine Legislature) to legislate how the resident commissioner shall be selected. The National Assembly enacted Commonwealth Act No. 10 late in 1935, which stated how the next resident commissioner shall be selected; it stated that the resident commissioner would now be appointed by the president of the Commonwealth of the Philippines with the consent of the Commission on Appointments. and that the resident commissioner holds office at the pleasure of the president, therefore there was no fixed term.

The two resident commissioners serving under the Jones Law, Pedro Guevara and Francisco Afan Delgado, were replaced when President Manuel L. Quezon appointed Quintin Paredes as their successor in February 1936.

The resident commissioner was never elected via direct election. unlike its Puerto Rican counterpart.

List of resident commissioners

Insular government era: 1907–1936

Commonwealth era: 1936–1946

Philippines's at-large congressional district

The resident commissioner represented the Philippines in the United States Congress.

See also
 List of Asian Americans in the United States Congress
 List of Hispanic and Latino Americans in the United States Congress
 Resident Commissioner
Representatives of the United States to the Philippines:
Governor-General of the Philippines from 1900 to 1935
High Commissioner to the Philippines from 1935 to 1946
List of ambassadors of the United States to the Philippines from 1946 to the present
List of ambassadors of the Philippines to the United States, representative of the Philippines to the United States

References

External links 
 

1907 establishments in the Philippines
1907 establishments in the United States
1946 disestablishments in the Philippines
1946 disestablishments in the United States

Political office-holders in the Philippines